Cytosolic acyl coenzyme A thioester hydrolase is an enzyme that in humans is encoded by the ACOT7 gene.

This gene encodes a member of the acyl coenzyme family. The encoded protein hydrolyzes the CoA thioester of palmitoyl-CoA and other long-chain fatty acids. Decreased expression of this gene may be associated with mesial temporal lobe epilepsy. Alternatively spliced transcript variants encoding distinct isoforms with different subcellular locations have been characterized.

References

External links

Further reading

Human proteins